Anthro may refer to:

 Anthropo-, a prefix meaning human, humanoid, or human-like
 Anthropology, the scientific study of humanity
 Anthropomorphism, the attribution of human traits to non-human entities
 Anthroposophy, a spiritualist movement
 Anthro (comics), a DC Comics caveman